Cedar Springs is a city in Kent County in the U.S. state of Michigan. The population was 3,509 at the 2010 census.

History
The area was first settled by Robin Hicks as early as 1855, and the first post office was established on February 4, 1857, with Nicholas Hill serving as the first postmaster.  The new village was platted in 1859.  The Grand Rapids and Indiana Railroad built a railway line through the area in 1868 and allowed for the growth of the village, which incorporated in 1871.  The name Cedar Springs came from the abundance of cedar trees and springs found throughout the area.  The village incorporated as a city in 1971.

Geography

Transportation

Bus
Indian Trails provides daily intercity bus service between Grand Rapids and Petoskey.

Major highways
 forms a portion of the western boundary of the city.
 turns north and runs concurrently with U.S. Route 131.

Demographics

2010 census
As of the census of 2010, there were 3,509 people, 1,215 households, and 887 families living in the city. The racial makeup of the city was 94.3% White, 0.8% African American, 0.6% Native American, 0.4% Asian, 0.9% from other races, and 3.0% from two or more races. Hispanic or Latino of any race were 4.2% of the population.

There were 1,215 households, of which 47.3% had children under the age of 18 living with them, 43.6% were married couples living together, 21.6% had a female householder with no husband present, 7.8% had a male householder with no wife present, and 27.0% were non-families. 22.2% of all households were made up of individuals, and 7% had someone living alone who was 65 years of age or older. The average household size was 2.81 and the average family size was 3.23.

The median age in the city was 29.6 years. 32.9% of residents were under the age of 18; 9.8% were between the ages of 18 and 24; 28.2% were from 25 to 44; 19.2% were from 45 to 64; and 9.9% were 65 years of age or older. The gender makeup of the city was 47.1% male and 52.9% female.

2000 census
As of the census of 2000, there were 3,112 people, 1,115 households, and 774 families living in the city. The racial makeup of the city was 95.85% White, 0.29% African American, 0.74% Native American, 0.45% Asian, 1.19% from other races, and 1.48% from two or more races. Hispanic or Latino of any race were 3.82% of the population. The ancestries of the city are 24% German, 14.2% American, 13.7% Dutch, 9.8% Irish, 9.5% English, and 7.4% Polish.

There were 1,115 households, out of which 40.1% had children under the age of 18 living with them, 46.3% were married couples living together, 17.9% had a female householder with no husband present, and 30.5% were non-families. 24.2% of all households were made up of individuals, and 7.3% had someone living alone who was 65 years of age or older.  The average household size was 2.71 and the average family size was 3.17.

In the city, the population was spread out, with 31.3% under the age of 18, 11.6% from 18 to 24, 31.0% from 25 to 44, 15.8% from 45 to 64, and 10.3% who were 65 years of age or older.  The median age was 29.6 years (below state average).  For every 100 females, there are 89.2 males.  For every 100 females age 18 and over, there were 87.5 males.

The median income for a household in the city was $39,542, and the median income for a family was $42,250. Males had a median income of $37,708 versus $23,056 for females. The per capita income for the city was $16,040.  About 12.4% of families and 13.8% of the population were below the poverty line, including 18.4% of those under age 18 and 7.5% of those age 65 or over.

Notable people 

 Bert Carr, college football player with U of M; practiced medicine in Cedar Springs
 Mike Huckleberry, Michigan House of Representatives from the 70th district; born in Cedar Springs
 Charles Kelly, historian; Born in Cedar Springs
 Andre Metzger, World medalist in freestyle wrestling, member of National Wrestling Hall of Fame; raised in Cedar Springs
 Brad Slaight, actor, writer, comedian, Hollywood celebrity; born in Cedar Springs

References

External links
Cedar Springs official website

Cities in Kent County, Michigan
Grand Rapids metropolitan area
Populated places established in 1857
1857 establishments in Michigan